WWE is an American professional wrestling promotion based out of Stamford, Connecticut and is the world's largest promotion. The company promotes several championships and title reigns are either determined by professional wrestling matches or are awarded to a wrestler, as a result of the culmination of various (scripted) storylines.

WWE currently divides its roster between three brands, which are where wrestlers exclusively perform on a weekly basis, albeit with some exceptions. The two primary brands that WWE promotes are Raw and SmackDown, collectively referred to as the main roster. NXT serves as the developmental brand for the main roster (though was considered a third main brand from 2019 to 2021).

There are currently 14 championships in WWE divided among the three brands. All three active brands have a primary, secondary, and tag team championship for male wrestlers and a singles championship for female wrestlers. There are two tag team championships for female wrestlers—one for the main roster, shared by Raw and SmackDown, and the other on NXT.

This list includes the number of times the wrestler has held the title, the date and location of the win, and a description of the winning bout.

Overview 
The American professional wrestling promotion WWE currently divides its roster into what the company refers to as brands. The two main brands that the company promotes are Raw and SmackDown, collectively referred to as the main roster. Wrestlers assigned to the two main brands exclusively compete on the respective weekly television programs, Monday Night Raw and Friday Night SmackDown, albeit with some exceptions. The Raw brand also has a supplementary online streaming program called Main Event. The monthly pay-per-view and livestreaming events feature wrestlers from both brands. 

NXT is WWE's developmental brand, which is where newer WWE wrestlers perform to ultimately be promoted to the main roster. Wrestlers assigned to NXT exclusively compete on the weekly television program, NXT, albeit with some exceptions, as well as the brand's supplementary online streaming program called Level Up. NXT also has its own major livestreaming events held periodically throughout the year.

Main roster

Men 
At the top of WWE's championship hierarchy for male wrestlers are Raw's WWE Championship and SmackDown's Universal Championship—both regarded as world heavyweight championships. Both titles are held and jointly defended by Roman Reigns, who is recognized as the Undisputed WWE Universal Champion. In his fourth reign as WWE Champion, he won the title by defeating Brock Lesnar on April 3, 2022, on Night 2 of WrestleMania 38 in a Winner Takes All match to claim both championships. In his second reign as Universal Champion, he won the title by defeating previous champion "The Fiend" Bray Wyatt and Braun Strowman, who Reigns pinned, in a No Holds Barred triple threat match at Payback on August 30, 2020.

Secondary titles for male wrestlers include the United States Championship on Raw and the Intercontinental Championship on SmackDown. The United States Championship is held by Austin Theory, who is in his second reign. He defeated previous champion Seth "Freakin" Rollins and Bobby Lashley in a triple threat match at Survivor Series WarGames on November 26, 2022. The Intercontinental Championship is held by first-time champion Gunther, who defeated Ricochet on the June 10, 2022, episode of SmackDown.

Tag team titles for male wrestlers include the Raw Tag Team Championship and the SmackDown Tag Team Championship—both regarded as world tag team championships. Both titles are held by The Usos (Jey Uso and Jimmy Uso), who are recognized as the Undisputed WWE Tag Team Champions, and predominantly defend the titles jointly across both brands. In their third reign as Raw Tag Team Champions, they won the title by defeating RK-Bro (Randy Orton and Riddle) on the May 20, 2022, episode of SmackDown in a Winners Take All match to claim both championships. In their fifth reign as SmackDown Tag Team Champions, they won the title by defeating Rey Mysterio and Dominik Mysterio on the Money in the Bank Kickoff pre-show on July 18, 2021.

Women 
At the top of WWE's championship hierarchy for female wrestlers are the Raw Women's Championship and the SmackDown Women's Championship—both regarded as women's world championships. The Raw Women's Championship is held by first-time champion Bianca Belair, who defeated Becky Lynch on April 2, 2022, at WrestleMania 38 Night 1. The SmackDown Women's Championship is held by record seven-time champion Charlotte Flair, who defeated Ronda Rousey on the December 30, 2022, episode of SmackDown.

The women's tag team championship is the WWE Women's Tag Team Championship, which is shared between Raw and SmackDown. The title is held by Becky Lynch and Lita  of the Raw brand who are in their first reign, both as a team and individually. They defeated Damage CTRL (Dakota Kai and Iyo Sky) on Raw on February 27, 2023.

Developmental

NXT 
NXT features three championships for men and two for women. Each gender division has a primary and tag team championship, while the men's division also has a secondary championship.

Men

The top title for male wrestlers is the NXT Championship. It is held by Bron Breakker, who is in his second reign. He won the title by defeating Dolph Ziggler on the April 4, 2022, episode of Raw. 

The secondary championship for male wrestlers is the NXT North American Championship. It is held by Wes Lee, who is in his first reign. He won the vacant title by defeating Carmelo Hayes, Von Wagner, Nathan Frazer, and Oro Mensah in a five-man ladder match at Halloween Havoc. Previous champion Solo Sikoa was stripped of the title as he was not originally booked in the match in which he won it. 

The men's tag team championship is the NXT Tag Team Championship. It is held by Gallus (Mark Coffey and Wolfgang), who are in their first reign. They defeated previous champions The New Day  (Kofi Kingston and Xavier Woods), Pretty Deadly (Elton Prince and Kit Wilson), and Chase University (Andre Chase and Duke Hudson) in a fatal four-way tag team match on February 4, 2023, at NXT Vengeance Day.

Women

The top title for female wrestlers is the NXT Women's Championship. It is held by Roxanne Perez, who is in her first reign. She won the title by defeating Mandy Rose on the December 13, 2022, episode of NXT. 

The tag team title for female wrestlers is the NXT Women's Tag Team Championship. It is held by first-time champions Fallon Henley and Kiana James, who defeated Katana Chance and Kayden Carter on February 4, 2023, at NXT Vengeance Day.

Current champions 

The colors and symbols indicate the home brand of the champions.

Main roster 
The WWE and Universal Championships - while maintaining their separate lineages - are jointly defended across both brands as the Undisputed WWE Universal Championship
The Raw and SmackDown Tag Team Championships  - while maintaining their separate lineages - are jointly defended across both brands as the Undisputed WWE Tag Team Championship
The WWE Women's Tag Team Championship is defended across both brands.

Raw

SmackDown

Developmental
NXT

See also 
 Grand Slam (professional wrestling)
 Triple Crown (professional wrestling)

 Champions in WWE lists

 List of NXT Champions
 List of NXT North American Champions
 List of NXT Tag Team Champions
 List of WWE Champions
 List of WWE Intercontinental Champions
 List of WWE Raw Tag Team Champions
 List of WWE Raw Women's Champions
 List of WWE SmackDown Tag Team Champions
 List of WWE SmackDown Women's Champions
 List of WWE United States Champions
 List of WWE Universal Champions

References

External links 
 WWE.com

WWE championships lists
Lists of women by occupation